Jacob Isaacson (May 5, 1911 – September 8, 1980) was an American composer and musician.
Isaacson was most noted for his own Colortone musical notation and his early works within this system. His association with the Fluxus movement was played down by Isaacson, who held European classical tradition in high regard, although his experimental and minimalist compositions drew inevitable comparison.

Life
Isaacson was born on May 5, 1911 in Midlothian, Virginia to Alfred and Martha Isaacson who relocated to nearby Chesterfield four years later. Isaacson developed a keen interest in music and a   proficiency at a number of instruments. He attended James River High School in Chesterfield and returned in 1937 to teach Art and Music there.
It was at James River High that Isaacson began a study of his synesthesia, a mild case of which he had correctly diagnosed, and his own emotional response to color. His private, experimental, compositions, "doodled" pieces consisting of finely inked lines on a conventional stave, took on a more powerful and expressive form and, in 1950, by now a lecturer at Virginia State University, he produced the first of his "Colortone" series.

Isaacson's Colortone notation, in its purest form, demanded nothing more from the musician than an emotional, response to color and shape. Ability and proficiency were secondary to sensitivity and subtlety in "reading" both the score and one's musical partners. These compositions quickly became part of his classes at Virginia State.

A move to Mannes College, New York, in 1951 encouraged fresh creativity, and by 1958 Isaacson had produced a further 8 Colortone pieces, the first of his four "Abstractions", and "For Diego Rivera", a tribute to the Mexican artist, who had died in November the previous year. Isaacson had put aside sheet music, favoring  slides, projections and abstract painting, and would not use printed scores again until his "Chromatics No. 1" in 1965.

List of significant works
The "Colortone" and "Abstractions" series can be performed by as many or as few musicians as conditions for performance allow and Isaacson refused to prescribe personnel for these pieces.

Colortone  series 1 to 9 (1950–1957)
Abstractions  series 1 to 4 (1955–1963)
For Diego Rivera  (1958)  piano, brass septet, string quartet, orchestra.
Chromatics  series 1 to 4 (1965–1974)  piano, 4 brass, recorder, violin, viola, cello, contrabass, orchestra, percussion,
Lucent Harmonic Color  (1975)  magnetic tape, atlas marimba, percussion

References

American male classical composers
American classical composers
Microtonal composers
Experimental composers
Postmodern composers
Musical notation
Fluxus
Visual music artists
People from Midlothian, Virginia
1911 births
1980 deaths
20th-century American composers
20th-century American male musicians